Sebastián Gerardo Píriz Ribas (born March 4, 1990 in Montevideo) is a Uruguayan footballer who plays as a central midfielder for River Plate in Montevideo.

External links
 
 
 Profile at Tenfield Digital 

1990 births
Living people
Uruguayan footballers
Association football midfielders
Danubio F.C. players
Club Atlético River Plate (Montevideo) players
Peñarol players
Club Atlético Tigre footballers
Al-Shabab FC (Riyadh) players
C.S. Emelec footballers
Liverpool F.C. (Montevideo) players
Panionios F.C. players
Expatriate footballers in Saudi Arabia
Uruguayan expatriates in Saudi Arabia
Saudi Professional League players
Argentine Primera División players
Uruguayan Primera División players
Ecuadorian Serie A players